Lieutenant-General Sir Stephen Remnant Chapman, KCH (1776 – 6 March 1851) was a British Army officer and colonial official who served two terms as Governor of Bermuda.

Chapman was the son of Richard Chapman, of Tainfield House, near Taunton, by Mary, the daughter of Stephen Remnant. He was educated at the Royal Military Academy, Woolwich and commissioned as a second lieutenant into the Royal Engineers on 18 September 1793. He was promoted to lieutenant on 20 November 1796 and first saw active service in the Anglo-Russian invasion of Holland. Chapman was promoted to captain-lieutenant on 18 April 1801, and to captain in March 1800. He was present at the Battle of Copenhagen (1807) before joining the British Army in Portugal in March 1809. Chapman was Commanding Royal Engineer at the Battle of Bussaco on 27 September 1810, after which his services were specially mentioned in dispatches. On 21 July 1813 he became lieutenant-colonel and served as Secretary to the Master-General of the Ordnance until his promotion to the rank of colonel on 29 July 1825. Between 1825 and 1831 he worked as a civil secretary in Gibraltar, and in 1831 he was knighted and became Governor of Bermuda. In 1837 he was promoted major-general and in 1846 to lieutenant-general. He was the uncle of the senior Royal Engineers officer, Sir Frederick Chapman.

References

1776 births
1851 deaths
Graduates of the Royal Military Academy, Woolwich
Royal Engineers officers
British Army personnel of the French Revolutionary Wars
British Army personnel of the Napoleonic Wars
British Army lieutenant generals
Governors of Bermuda
People from Taunton